Thim is a surname. Notable people with the surname include:

Choy Mow Thim (born 1947), Malaysian cyclist
Lee Yoon Thim (1905–1977), Malaysian-Chinese architect

See also
Tim (given name)